Speldhurst is a village and civil parish in the borough of Tunbridge Wells in Kent, England.

Speldhurst has a primary school, a parish church, a general store with post office, a pub, and a small business park. There is a residential care home for the elderly, Birchwood House, which is a former manor house with a rich history.

History
The name Speldhurst derives from the Old English for 'wooded hill ('hyrst') where wood-chips ('speld') are found'.

Parish Church

St Mary's Church Speldhurst was designed by John Oldrid Scott and built by Hope Constable of Penshurst, being dedicated to St Mary on 6 May 1871. The stained glass windows are by Burne Jones and William Morris. At present the parish of Speldhurst is part of a united parish with Ashurst and Groombridge. A previous incumbent of St Mary's Church Speldhurst was Rev Baden Powell, the father of Lord Baden-Powell who founded the Scout Movement. Rev. Powell married his second wife in the Church, and she is buried in the churchyard.

The hymnwriter Francis Pott resided in the parish until his death in 1909. Pott, who wrote popular hymns such as "Angel voices, ever singing" and "The strife is o'er, the battle done", donated a chalice and paten to the church plate of St Mary's.

Local customs

Speldhurst has an annual pram race on the second Sunday in May. There are various race categories of different age groups with the main event being two laps around the village. Contestants have to push a "baby" around the course and all have to down half a pint every time they pass the two drinks stations, one situated by the George and Dragon and the other by the old Northfields pub.

Parish villages and hamlets
 Ashurst
 Langton Green
 Old Groombridge
 Speldhurst itself
Stone Cross, a hamlet which includes Burrswood, a building designed by Decimus Burton

References

External links

 Speldhurst Online
 Speldhurst Parish Council website
 St Mary's church
 
 Speldhurst Pram Race
Birchwood House

Villages in Kent
Civil parishes in Kent